Ionomycin is an ionophore and an antibiotic that binds calcium ions (Ca2+) in a ratio 1:1. It is produced by the bacterium Streptomyces conglobatus. It binds also other divalent cations like magnesium and cadmium, but binds Ca2+ preferably.

It has 14 chiral centers. Its β-diketone and carboxylic acid group form a chelate with calcium.

It was extracted in 1978 and the complete structure was elucidated in 1979.

It is used in research to raise the intracellular calcium level (Ca2+) and as a research tool to understand Ca2+ transport across biological membranes.

Ionomycin is often sold as a free acid, or as a Ca2+ salt. Both are insoluble in water, but soluble in fats and DMSO. Because of their fat solubility, they bind to proteins like albumin, which may interfere with their use in studies involving blood.

References

Ionophores
3-Hydroxypropenals
Tetrahydrofurans
Hydroxy acids
Keto acids